Jeru is an album recorded by American jazz saxophonist and bandleader Gerry Mulligan featuring performances recorded in 1962 which were released on the Columbia label.

Reception

Allmusic awarded the album 3 stars stating "Mulligan is in fine form and, even if the music on this LP is not all that essential, it is quite enjoyable".

Track listing
 "Capricious" (Billy Taylor) - 5:47
 "Here I'll Stay" (Kurt Weill, Alan Jay Lerner) - 5:00
 "Inside Impromptu" (Taylor) - 5:32
 "You've Come Home" (Cy Coleman, Carolyn Leigh) - 5:40
 "Get Out of Town" (Cole Porter) - 4:12
 "Blue Boy" (Gerry Mulligan) - 4:38
 "Lonely Town" (Leonard Bernstein, Betty Comden, Adolph Green) - 5:34

Personnel
Gerry Mulligan - baritone saxophone
Tommy Flanagan - piano
Ben Tucker - bass
Dave Bailey - drums
Alec Dorsey - congas

References

Gerry Mulligan albums
1962 albums
Columbia Records albums